The 2019–20 Atlantic 10 Conference men's basketball season was the 44th season of Atlantic 10 Conference basketball. The season began with practices in October 2019, followed by the start of the 2019–20 NCAA Division I men's basketball season in November. League play began in early January and ended in early March.

The 2020 Atlantic 10 tournament was to be held from March 11–15, 2020, at Barclays Center in Brooklyn, New York, but on March 12, the season was suspended due to the COVID-19 pandemic.

VCU is the defending regular-season champion, while Saint Louis is the defending Atlantic 10 Tournament champion.

Dayton won the regular season. Due to the COVID-19 pandemic, there was no Atlantic 10 Tournament champion.

Head coaches

Coaching changes 
On March 15, 2019, George Washington announced that Maurice Joseph would not return after three seasons as head coach of the Colonials. Six days later on March 21, George Washington announced that it had hired Siena head coach Jamion Christian to replace Joseph.

On March 19, 2019, Saint Joseph's announced that head coach Phil Martelli would not be retained following 24 seasons leading the Hawks. On March 28, Philadelphia 76ers assistant coach Billy Lange was named head coach.

Coaches 

Notes:
 All records, appearances, titles, etc. are from time with current school only.
 Overall and A-10 records are from time at current school through the end of the 2018–19 season.

Conference matrix 
This table summarizes the head-to-head results between teams in conference play. Each team will play 18 conference games: one game vs. eight opponents and two games against five opponents.

Preseason

Preseason poll 
Prior to the season at the conference's annual media day, awards and a poll were chosen by a panel of the league's head coaches and select media members.

Preseason all-conference teams

Regular season

Early season tournaments 

Source:

Conference awards 
On March 10, 2020, the Atlantic 10 announced its conference awards.

References